The SQL/CLI, or Call-Level Interface, is an extension to the SQL standard is defined in SQL:1999 (based on CLI-95), but also available in later editions such as ISO/IEC 9075-3:2003. This extension defines common interfacing components (structures and procedures) that can be used to execute SQL statements from applications written in other programming languages. The SQL/CLI extension is defined in such a way that SQL statements and SQL/CLI procedure calls are treated as separate from the calling application's source code.

See also
Call Level Interface
SQL
SQL:2003

References

SQL